"We Don't Make the Wind Blow" is a song by Dutch duo The Common Linnets. The song was released in the Netherlands as a digital download on 1 May 2015 through Universal Music Group as the lead single from their second studio album II (2015). The song peaked at number 74 on the Dutch Singles Chart. It was the title song for the Dutch broadcast of the first season of American television series Wayward Pines in 2015 on Fox (Netherlands) as of May 14 accompanied with a music-special 'The Wayward Pines Sessions'.

Track listing

Chart performance

Weekly charts

Release history

References

2014 songs
2015 singles
The Common Linnets songs
Universal Music Group singles
Songs written by Rob Crosby